Hujjat al-IslamAsghar Dirbaz (born 1959 in Mianeh, East Azerbaijan) is an Iranian Shiite cleric, author and politician. He is a member of 4th and 5th Assembly of Experts from the West Azerbaijan electorate. Dirbaz won his membership with 1,208,599 votes in the midterm election on 22 March 2013. He was reelected in the 2016 elections. He is also the president of University of Qom.

See Also 

 List of members in the Fourth Term of the Council of Experts
 List of members in the Fifth Term of the Council of Experts

References

People from Mianeh
Members of the Assembly of Experts
Living people
1959 births